The Ride of the Kings is a festival that is celebrated in Spring, at the Pentecost, in Moravia, the south-east of the Czech Republic. In 2011, it was added to the UNESCO Representative List of Masterpieces of the Oral and Intangible Heritage of Humanity.

The festival takes place in the region historically known as Moravian Slovakia. It is celebrated annually in the village of Vlčnov (pop.3,000), every three years in Hluk (pop.4,400), every two years in Kunovice (pop.5,500), and occasionally in Skoronice (pop.550) as part of another festival called the "Slovácký rok" (Slovak Year).

Description 
Until World War II, the Ride was an integral part of the Feast of Pentecost, but has since become largely a social event. The ceremony begins with a religious service and the approval of the Mayor, followed by the preparation of the costumes and decorations for the horses and riders. These are made by the women of the villages, according to traditional colors and designs unique to each place.

The Ride itself is performed by young men who number between 15 and 25. They are preceded and followed by singers and an honor guard wearing unsheathed swords to protect the "King"; a young boy of 10 to 15 years old, whose face is partially covered, holding a rose in his mouth. The King and his groomsmen are dressed in feminine costumes, while all the other riders wear masculine clothing. After riding through the village for a few hours, sometimes exchanging witticisms with the crowd, the participants return home then, later in the evening, meet at the "King's House" for music and dancing.

Origins
It has been celebrated in largely its current form since 1808, but its origins are unclear. A possible source are the Easter processions which, themselves, date from pagan ceremonies to ensure a good harvest. There are also similarities to initiation ceremonies for young men in Kyrgyzstan. In the Czech Republic, it is associated with various tales from history, including one that involves Matthias Corvinus dressing as a woman to flee from a disastrous battle, and myths such as the search for the "King of Barley" in Haná.

In fiction 
The Ride of the Kings is a subject of the novel Žert (The Joke) by the Czech-French writer Milan Kundera (part 4, Jaroslav).

References

External links

 Ride of the Kings from the official Vlčnov website.
 Ride of the Kings, a video from The Institute of Folk Culture @ YouTube

Czech culture
Intangible Cultural Heritage of Humanity